Apocholic acid is an unsaturated bile acid first characterized in the 1920s. It has questionable carcinogenic activity as experimentally, sarcomas were induced in mice with injection of deoxycholic acid. 

The salts and esters of apocholic acid are known as apocholates.

See also
 Apocholate citrate agar

References

External links
 5-beta-Chol-8(14)-en-24-oic acid, 3-alpha,12-alpha-dihydroxy-, sodium salt at environmentalchemistry.com

Bile acids
Cholanes